Marinellina is a genus of gastrotrichs belonging to the family Turbanellidae.

The species of this genus are found in Southern America.

Species:

Marinellina flagellata

References

Gastrotricha